The Black Sea Transmission Network is a project for electric power transmission from Georgia to Turkey.

Technical description
The project foresees a rehabilitation and expansion of the existing transmission system. The 500 kV overhead line will be a single-circuit transmission line.

At Akhaltsikhe substation two back-to-back high-voltage direct current stations, each with a capacity of 350 MW will be installed. A 400 kV AC overhead line will connect it with Borçka substation in Turkey.  About  of it will run in the territory of Georgia.  The first HVDC back-to-back station would be operational in May 2012 and the second one in May 2013.  This link will be built by Siemens.

Financing
The project is financed by several European finance institutions.  The European Investment Bank and the European Bank for Reconstruction and Development lend €80 million both while the German development bank KfW provides €100 million in the form of a grant (€25 million) and a long-term loan (€75 million, €20 million Development Bank of Austria, w:de:Oesterreichische Entwicklungsbank (OeEB) risk participation).  The project is developed by the Georgian state-owned transmission system operator Energotrans.

See also 

 List of HVDC Projects
 Energy in Georgia (country)

References

Weblinks 
 http://www.gse.com.ge/M9Ltvi2EQCCNYg7LvHW0JQ.html
 http://www.energy.siemens.com/us/pool/hq/power-transmission/HVDC/HVDC-Classic/pm-pdf/EPT201008116e.pdf

Electric power infrastructure in Georgia (country)
Electric power infrastructure in Turkey
Proposed electric power infrastructure in Georgia (country)
Proposed electric power infrastructure in Turkey
Proposed electric power transmission systems